1981 World Masters Athletics Championships is the fourth in a series of World Masters Athletics Outdoor Championships (called World Veterans Championships, World Veterans Games, or World Veterans Track and Field Championships at the time) that took place in Christchurch, New Zealand, from 7 to 14 January 1981.
The turnout was better than expected, despite the remote location,

though no Eastern European or third world nations were represented.

The main venue was Queen Elizabeth II Park,

which was later destroyed by the 2011 Christchurch earthquake. A grass track outside the stadium was used to hold many running events.

This edition of masters athletics Championships had a minimum age limit of 35 years for women and 40 years for men.

The governing body of this series is World Association of Veteran Athletes (WAVA). WAVA was formed during meeting at the inaugural edition of this series at Toronto in 1975, then officially founded during the second edition in 1977, then renamed as World Masters Athletics (WMA) at the Brisbane Championships in 2001.

This Championships was organized by WAVA in coordination with a Local Organising Committee (LOC) headed by John Macdonald.

John Macdonald also ran in the competition and successfully defended his M45 10K title from 1979.

In addition to a full range of track and field events,

non-stadia events included 10K Cross Country, 10K Race Walk (women), 20K Race Walk (men), and Marathon.
Many distance runners also competed in 10K and 25K road races at the 14th Annual World Veterans Distance Running Championships held around Centennial Lagoon in Palmerston North on 3 - 4 January.

Controversy
In 1976, the International Amateur Athletic Federation (IAAF) had expelled the Amateur Athletic Union of South Africa due to the apartheid policy of the South African government at that time.

The Gleneagles Agreement further prohibited South African athletes from participating in sports at Commonwealth member states such as New Zealand,

so South Africans were banned from this Championships.

they are shown with their native  flag in the Results Nationality column below.

Demonstrations and violence occurred when the press reported the participation of South African athletes.

At the Championships General Assembly, a motion to ban South African athletes from future WAVA activities was ruled "out of order" since the WAVA constitution states that membership is open to all men and women of eligible age.

WAVA did not expect such troubles at the next World Games scheduled for 1983 in San Juan, Puerto Rico, 

but Puerto Rican politics eventually would make South African participation an issue as well. After the end of the apartheid system, South Africa officially rejoined IAAF in 1992.

Results
Past Championships results are archived at WMA.

Additional archives are available from Museum of Masters Track & Field

as a pdf book

and in pdf newsletters from World Association of Veteran Athletes

and from National Masters News.

Several masters world records were set at this Championships. World records for 1981 are from the National Masters News newsletter (length measurements are converted from feet to meters) unless otherwise noted.
Among the notable performances, John Gilmour broke his own M60 WR for the 4th time, and the blind sprinter Fritz Assmy won the M65 100m and 200m, again guided by his son-in-law Klaus Hinrichsen as he was in 1979.

A photograph of Assmy running with his son-in-law is included in the pdf book.

Women

Men

References

World Masters Athletics Championships
World Masters Athletics Championships
International athletics competitions hosted by New Zealand
1981
Masters athletics (track and field) records